opened in the grounds of Kōchi Castle, Kōchi, Kōchi Prefecture, Japan in 1997. It is dedicated to the men of letters and literary life of the area from Tosa Nikki, through locally born Five Mountains master Gidō Shūshin, up until today.

See also
 Kōchi Castle Museum of History
 Yoshii Isamu Memorial Museum
 The Museum of Art, Kōchi

References

External links

  Kōchi Literary Museum

Kōchi
Museums in Kōchi Prefecture
Literary museums in Japan
Museums established in 1997
1997 establishments in Japan